Team Filthy is a professional wrestling stable, performing in New Japan Pro-Wrestling (NJPW) and previously Major League Wrestling (MLW) . The group was formed on October 5, 2017, during One Shot by "Filthy" Tom Lawlor.

History

Major League Wrestling (2017–2021)
Before his match with Jeff Cobb during MLW's One Shot event, Lawlor came to the ring with two unnamed figures dressed in the same tracksuit as him. These cornermen aided Lawlor in his victory by giving him a substance to blind Cobb. The cornermen interfered on Lawlor's behalf again at Never Say Never during his match with Matt Riddle. While still being accompanied by unknown cornermen, Lawlor would add Seth Petruzelli and Simon Gotch to his group, formally being named Team Filthy with the latter's inclusion.

The group would come into conflict with rival heel stables, Promociones Dorado, and the Stud Stable for opportunities at the World Heavyweight Championship and dominant control of the company. Around this time, Fred Yehi was recruited into Team Filthy by Lawlor and Gotch after they saved him from a confrontation with the Stud Stable. Lawlor earned a World Heavyweight Championship match by winning the inaugural Battle Riot. Petruzelli would be attacked by the Stud Stable's Dirty Blondes and would eventually be quietly removed from Team Filthy and written off MLW television.  Tom Lawlor would go on to beat the Stud Stable's Jake Hager to eliminate the group as a threat to Team Filthy. After Lawlor defeated Shane Strickland for the honorary title of being "The Ace of MLW", he challenged the champion Low Ki, for a World Heavyweight Championship title match at the 2019 SuperFight, turning into a fan favorite. As Yehi had temporarily left MLW to do an excursion to several European promotions, specifically in Germany, Lawlor feuded with Sami Callihan who was hired by Promociones Dorado to attack Lawlor ahead of his match with Low Ki. Lawlor defeated Callihan in a Chicago Street Fight but was betrayed by Gotch who had led Lawlor into an ambush by Promociones Dorado after the match. It was revealed that Gotch too was paid off by Promociones Dorado's founder and promoter Salina de la Renta.

As the feud between Lawlor and Low Ki heated up, Low Ki, along with fellow Promociones Dorado members, Ricky Martinez and El Hijo de L.A. Park, attacked a recently returned Fred Yehi and new Team Filthy member, Ariel Dominguez. Lawlor would avenge his betrayal at the hands of Gotch, defeating him in a No Holds Bard Match. After the match, Lawlor reiterated his challenge to Low Ki for the MLW Championship. Yehi would go on to unsuccessfully challenge Low Ki for the MLW Championship as Lawlor would stay one step ahead of Promociones Dorado and Sami Callihan. Sometime after his match with Ricky Martinez, Fred Yehi would leave MLW and be quietly removed from Team Filthy. Lawlor would finally defeat Low Ki for the MLW World Heavyweight Championship. While Team Filthy would still exist at this point, Lawlor would spend the first half of 2019 defending the MLW Championship and feuding with Gotch's new stable, Contra Unit. Dominguez would be the only other active member of Team Filthy until he left MLW after his match with Dominic Garrini.

Lawlor would go on to lose the MLW Championship to Contra's Jacob Fatu at Kings of Colosseum. Aligning himself with Low Ki and Marshall and Ross Von Erich, Lawlor would defeat Contra at War Chamber. Lawlor became irate at the Von Erichs feeling that the attention they received superseded his feud with Contra and his opportunity to regain the MLW Championship. On the 2019 MLW Thanksgiving special, Lawler attacked Ross Von Erich with a chair costing him the World title match with Jacob Fatu and reverting into a villain. Lawlor also attacked Marshall Von Erich with a pipe a week prior, injuring his leg. With Lawyer's true colors exposed, his feud with the Von Erichs began. He also stated that he was thinking about reforming Team Filthy, which was dormant during Lawlor's championship reign and seemingly ceased when Dominguez left MLW.

Lawlor took the first steps to reform Team Filthy bringing an unnamed cornerman in a Team Filthy tracksuit on the first MLW in 2020. On that episode, Lawlor challenged the "Greatest Von Erich", Rip Von Erich, to a match. Allegedly the son of the "late" Lance Von Erich (himself only a Von Erich in kayfabe and was still alive during that episode's airing), Rip Von Erich was defeated by Lawlor in a squash match meant to provoke Ross and Marshall. Lawlor goaded the brothers further after the match leading the Von Erichs to confront him. As they entered the ring, Ross and Marshall were attacked from behind by Kenny Doane and Mike Mondo of the Spirit Squad with Lawlor and the cornerman joined in on the assault. Renaming Doane and Mondo the Filthy Squad, Lawlor formerly acknowledged that Team Filthy was not only back, but the pair were accepted into the group. Trading in their whistles and green cheerleader gear for black karate gis, the Filthy Squad fell in a losing effort to Ross and Mashall Von Erich. After the match, Doane and Rip Von Erich failed in retaliation against the Von Erichs. After their loss, the Filthy Squad were not seen again on MLW, with Bocchini speculating that they were just Lawlor's patsies used to attack the Von Erichs.

In the next episode, Lawlor would recruit Dominic Garrini into Team Filthy. At the end of his debut episode, Erick Stevens would aid Lawlor and Garrini brutalizing the Von Eric's. On MLW's 100th episode, it was formally revealed that Rip Von Erich is Kit Osbourne and is Team Filthy's cornerman. Stevens lost a match to Davey Boy Smith Jr. drawing the Smith into the feud between Team Filthy and Von Erichs. Team Filthy would involve themselves in Lawlor's match with Killer Kross which causes Smith and the Von Erichs to intervene. Forcing Team Filthy to retreat, Smith challenged Lawlor, Garrini, Stevens, and Osbourne to an 8-Man Tag Match. The match would end when Osborne was pinned by Mashall Von Erich and put through a table by Smith. From there the battle between the raining members of Team Filthy and their opponents would devolve into a chaotic brawl. Before the episode ended, King Mo attacked Kross with a baseball bat. Team Filthy revealed that King Mo and his manager, American Top Team Founder, Dan Lambert, became members of the group. King Mo defeated Low Ki in a singles match, assisted by an umbrella shot by Lawlor.

Due to the real-world effects of the COVID-19 pandemic, MLW stopped running shows after their MLW Super Series shows with Lucha Libre AAA Worldwide and Promociones EMW for eight months. As revealed in the Pulp FUSION shorts in the interim, Team Filthy continued to cut promos on and plot against their enemies. Osbourne would make his last on-screen appearance in MLW during Pulp FUSION being no longer formally aligned with Team Filthy afterwards. Once MLW Fusion returned to air, Erick Stevens had retired from professional wrestling. In his place, Garrini recruited Kevin Ku, who had been signed by MLW, into Team Filthy. Lawlor and Stevens agreed with Stevens (in kayfabe) sponsoring Ku with his Kookies and Kream Sarasota business because it was a tax write off. Garrini and Ku re-formed their tag team from the independent circuit, Violence is Forever.

Lawlor maintained his position in the main event scene after winning the Opera Cup while Violence is Forever is putting its focus on winning the MLW World Tag Team Championships. Lawlor would continue his rivalry with the Von Erichs as he and Violence is Forever would attack them after their match with Fatu and Gotch.  Placed as the special guest referee by Salina de la Renta during her produced MLW episode, Lawlor, along with L.A. Park Jr., willingly cheated Ross and Marshall out of the MLW Tag Team Championships in favor of Los Parks (L.A. Park and El Hijo de L.A. Park). Team Filthy would also attack A. C. H. prior to his MLW World Heavyweight Championship with Jacob Fatu. Lawlor, who beat him clean in the Opera Cup, did not want Team Filthy playing second fiddle to him.

Team Filthy would receive some comeuppance on Lawlor's low quality Filthy Island special. A returning King Mo, after nearly a year questioning Low Ki's mental faculties and boasting about his tainted win against him, was beaten by Low Ki in the main event in under a minute. As Lambert cried fowl on commentary, Team Filthy attacked Low Ki only for the Von Erichs to arrive and help him to fight off Lawlor, Ku and Garrini. Team Filthy members Dan Lambert and Danny Limelight make frequent appearances in AEW.

Paradigm Pro Wrestling (2020–2021) 
In mid-2020, Team Filthy members, Tom Lawlor, Erick Stevens and Kevin Ku made sporadic appearances in PPW while Dominic Garrini made steady appearances. Stevens would have his last wrestling match athletes the PPW Trapsoul event. At the 2021 PPW UWFi Rules Contenders Series, Lawlor and Garrini would once again re-form Team Filthy within the promotion. In the first episode of UFWi Series, Lawlor inducted Matt Makowski into Team Filthy.

New Japan Pro-Wrestling (2020–present) 
Making his New Japan debut at Lion's Break Collision, Lawlor was spotted on NJPW Strong by Kevin Kelly watching the match between Jeff Cobb and Rocky Romero vs. J. R. Kratos and Rust Taylor. Before Lawlor's match with Fred Rosser, it was confirmed that he aligned himself with Kratos and Taylor to form the New Japan version of Team Filthy. Lawlor stated that he teamed up with Kratos and Taylor because he was looking for a fight team that would be the strongest ever seen. Just one week after their formation, Danny Limelight would turn on Romero and join Team Filthy. Together, Team Filthy was victorious against Cobb, Romero, Rosser, and PJ Black in an eight-man tag team match. The next time Team Filthy appeared however, they were defeated by their four opponents in three separate matches. It was Taylor's "white belt performance" against Cobb, however, that caused Lawlor to fire him from the group. Wasting no time, Lawlor recruited Chris Dickinson in his place.

Eventually, cracks in Team Filthy started to form. On Night 2 of Strong Style Evolved 2021 Limelight would complain about not getting a qualifying match for the 2021 New Japan Cup USA tournament. Limelight also would insult Kratos and bring up his qualifying loss to Fred Rosser. Lawlor implied that Limelight missed his opportunity while he was wrestling for All Elite Wrestling and bring up Dickinson's New Beginning USA loss to Ren Narita. Dickinson was incensed by Lawlor's comments and Kratos was tired of Limelight talking too much. After the ROH 19th Anniversary Show, Dickinson aligned himself with Brody King, something Kratos and possibly Lawlor was not aware of. During the Road to New Japan Cup USA 2021, Dickinson refused to break Sterling Riegel's arm on Lawlor's order, which a briefly hesitant Kratos did. On April 23, 2021, Lawlor defeated Brody King to become the winner of the 2021 New Japan Cup USA tournament and the inaugural Strong Openweight Champion. As Lawlor immediately demand his first challenger, Dickinson surprised Lawlor and Kratos and accepted Lawlor's challenge. Dickinson secured a Team Filthy victory against King, Karl Fredericks, TJP, and Clark Connors but was betrayed by Team Filthy after the match. Limelight, speaking on behalf of the group, said that Dickinson bit the hand that fed him with his recent actions. For his part, Dickinson didn't want to a part of Team Filthy anymore because of their ruthless actions.

Members

Current

Former

Timeline

Championships and accomplishments

Professional wrestling
Major League Wrestling
MLW World Heavyweight Championship (1 time) - Lawlor
Battle Riot (2018) - Lawlor
Opera Cup (2020) - Lawlor
New Japan Pro-Wrestling
Strong Openweight Championship (1 time) - Lawlor
New Japan Cup USA (2021) - Lawlor
Paradigm Pro Wrestling
PPW Heavy Hitters Championship (2 times) - Garrini (1) and Makowski (1)
Pro Wrestling Illustrated
Ranked Lawlor No. 59 of the top 500 singles wrestlers in the PWI 500 in 2021
Ranked Dickinson No. 92 of the top 500 singles wrestlers in the PWI 500 in 2021
Ranked Kratos No. 124 of the top 500 singles wrestlers in the PWI 500 in 2021
Ranked Fish No. 200 of the top 500 singles wrestlers in the PWI 500 in 2022
Ranked Yehi No. 237 of the top 500 singles wrestlers in the PWI 500 in 2019
Ranked Makowski No. 279 of the top 500 singles wrestlers in the PWI 500 in 2021
Ranked Stevens No. 279 of the top 500 singles wrestlers in the PWI 500 in 2020
Ranked Garrini No. 310 of the top 500 singles wrestlers in the PWI 500 in 2021
Ranked Ku No. 333 of the top 500 singles wrestlers in the PWI 500 in 2021
Ranked Limelight No. 357 of the top 500 singles wrestlers in the PWI 500 in 2021
Ranked Gotch No. 372 of the top 500 singles wrestlers in the PWI 500 in 2018
Ranked Isaacs No. 315 of the top 500 singles wrestlers in the PWI 500 in 2022

References

Major League Wrestling teams and stables
New Japan Pro-Wrestling teams and stables